The Foreign Reporter of the Year award is one of the honours given annually by The Press Awards in the UK.

History
Over the years, the categories have increased from 3 in 1962, to 31 in 2014.  There have been many different awards in the area of international and foreign reporting, with some years having more than one; the first category was International Reporter of the Year in the 1966 awards, the current is Foreign Reporter of the Year.

The 2007 awards saw the introduction of an International Journalist of the Year category; unlike the earlier International Reporter of the Year category from 1966-1989, this category honours journalists from countries outside the UK.

Foreign Reporter of the Year
Foreign Reporter of the Year, previously Foreign Journalist of the Year (in memory of David Holden) and David Holden International Reporter of the Year.

International Journalist of the Year
Unlike the other categories, this category is for non-UK journalists.

Foreign Stringer of the Year
Foreign Stringer of the Year, previously Foreign Stringer of the Year (in memory of David Blundy), and David Blundy Award

International Reporter of the Year

References

External links
 British Press Awards

British journalism awards